The 1987 IUSY Festival was organised by the International Union of Socialist Youth in Valencia, Spain in July of that year.

The theme of the festival was the power of solidarity and notable events included speeches by the FSLN from Nicaragua and a tentative (and rather hostile) discussion between the Israeli Labor Party Youth and the General Union of Palestinian Students (GUPS), the exile student wing of the Palestine Liberation Organization.

Other events of note included a row between the Trotskyists of the RSL/Militant Tendency dominated Labour Party Young Socialists (LPYS) and the festival organisers (the British Labour Party's student wing, the National Organisation of Labour Students (NOLS) sided with the organisers in trying to keep the LPYS delegation - led by Tommy Sheridan - out).

During the festival a place in Valencia was renamed to Plaza Olof Palme in the presence of Willy Brandt chairman of the Socialist International. The festival closed with a rally addressed by the Prime Minister of Spain and Spanish Socialist Workers' Party (PSOE) leader Felipe Gonzalez.

Festivals in Spain